Deledda International School is a semi-private English-speaking school in Genoa, Italy. Despite being an independent school, the school is helped by the government of the Comune di Genova. It is not affiliated with the public school "Liceo Linguistico Deledda". It was established in 1999 and became a world school. The school currently offers both the International Baccalaureate's Diploma Programme (grades 11 and 12) and the Middle Years Programme (grades 6 through 10). In 2016 it opened a primary school (grades 1 to 5) where classes are taught mostly in Italian, with extra hours of English.

References

Schools in Genoa
International Baccalaureate schools in Italy